Calora is an unincorporated community in Arthur County, Nebraska, United States.

History
A post office was established at Calora in 1912, and remained in operation until it was discontinued in 1951. The community's name is an amalgamation of Carl and Oura.

References

Unincorporated communities in Arthur County, Nebraska
Unincorporated communities in Nebraska